Kati Ilona Agócs (born January 20, 1975) is an American-Canadian composer and a member of the composition faculty at the New England Conservatory of Music in Boston, Massachusetts.

Education
Agócs attended the Juilliard School in New York where she earned a Master's and Doctoral degrees under the guidance of Milton Babbitt.  She was a composition fellow at the Aspen Music Festival and School and the Tanglewood Music Center, where she held the ASCAP Leonard Bernstein Composer Fellowship in 2007.

Career
From 2005 to 2006, she lived in Budapest and wrote on the new-music scene in Hungary for the journal The Musical Times. She had previously organized an exchange program between the Juilliard School and the Liszt Academy. The Hungarian-language weekly, Bécsi Napló (Vienna Journal) acknowledged her contribution to the visibility of Hungarian composers abroad. She served as Composer in Residence for the National Youth Orchestra of Canada in 2010.

Agócs was awarded a Guggenheim Fellowship in 2013. In 2014 the American Academy of Arts and Letters named her as recipient of the Arts and Letters Award in Music. She maintains a work studio in Flatrock, Newfoundland, Canada.

Personal life
Agócs is married to the American composer Robert Beaser.

Music
Boston Modern Orchestra Project recorded and released the 2016 album The Debrecen Passion, named one of the top 10 Classical albums of 2016 by the Boston Globe. The title track of this album was nominated in 2017 by the Canadian Academy of Recording Arts and Sciences for a Juno Award, "Classical Composition of the Year. 

Agócs has written on American music for the journal Tempo and also created a critical edition of the Symphony in A Major by Leopold Damrosch.

Select principal works

Solo and chamber works up to seven instruments
Concerto for Violin and Percussion Orchestra (Solo violin and six percussionists) 2018. Recorded performance by violinist Nicholas Kitchen and the New England Conservatory Percussion Ensemble led by director Frank Epstein.
Crystallography (Soprano, flute, clarinet, violin, cello, piano, and percussion) 2012 (Text: Christian Bök)
Every Lover is a Warrior (Solo harp) 2005
Hymn (Saxophone quartet) 2005
Imprimatur (String Quartet No. 2) 2018
Voices of the Immaculate (Lyric Mezzo-Soprano, Flute, Clarinet, Violin, Cello, and Piano/Celeste) 2021 (Text: Assembled by the composer: Fragments from Revelations and testimony from survivors of abuse by clergy)

Orchestra / large ensemble works
By the Streams of Babylon (Two amplified soprano voices and chamber orchestra) 2009 (Text: Psalm 137 in Latin)
The Debrecen Passion (Twelve female voices and chamber orchestra) 2015 (Text: poems by Szilárd Borbély in Hungarian; Lamentations of Mary in modern Hungarian translation by Ferenc Molnár [fragments]; Ana B’Choach [in Hebrew]; Stabat Mater Specioso [fragments, in Latin]; Thou Art a Vineyard [hymn text in Georgian])
Elysium (Chamber Orchestra and Recorded Sound)
Horn Concerto (Solo Horn and Chamber Orchestra) 2021
Requiem Fragments (Chamber Orchestra) 2008
Shenanigan (Orchestra) 2011

References

External links
Kati Agócs Personal Web Site
New England Conservatory Faculty Web Site

1975 births
Living people
Aspen Music Festival and School alumni
Canadian composers
Canadian people of Hungarian descent
Musicians from Windsor, Ontario
New England Conservatory faculty
Canadian women composers